Ryan is an Australian adventure television series screened by the Seven Network from 27 May 1973. The series was produced by Crawford Productions and had a run of 39 one-hour episodes.

Synopsis 
The title character was a dashing private investigator played by Rod Mullinar. (A few years prior Mullinar had briefly taken the lead role in the similar Crawfords series Hunter (1967) in its closing episodes after the original lead actor Tony Ward left the show.) Ryan's assistant Julie King was played by New Zealand-born actor Pamela Stephenson, soon to leave for England and a successful television career. Other regular characters were Tony Angelini (Luigi Villani), a taxi driver and Ryan's regular informant, while Detective Cullen (Colin McEwan) was Ryan's main liaison with the police force.

Production
Ryan was shot entirely on film and in colour with an eye to potential international sales. An initial sale of 39 episodes to the Seven Network recouped only 55% of the series' relatively high production costs. An international sale was therefore crucial to the show's continued feasibility.

Australian television was still in the process of transitioning to colour broadcasting in 1973, while key international markets were already in colour and would more readily purchase a colour series. Though many Australian series shot their interior scenes on videotape in the studio using a multiple-camera setup with only outdoor scenes shot on film, many television studios were not yet equipped with colour equipment. This meant Ryan had to be shot entirely on film. In another concession to international marketability Mullinar was instructed to play the role using a Mid-Atlantic American accent.

The series premiered in May 1973, rating well in Brisbane and Adelaide, but failing in the crucial Melbourne and Sydney markets. A key reason for low ratings was the fact that the Nine Network had moved the highly popular police drama Division 4 to a new night to compete with the much-hyped new series. Ryan was moved around the schedules in order to find an audience, but ratings remained mediocre. After the initial 39 episodes were in the can the Ryan crew were, in expectation of a second series, retained by Crawfords and put to work on Homicide - whose output was increased to two episodes a week - on that show's second weekly episode. This resulted in one cross-over episode, with the Ryan regular characters appearing in an episode of Homicide. One regular cast member, Pamela Stephenson, did not appear, having opted to leave the series during the recess.

Ultimately Ryan was not renewed by the Seven Network due to insufficient ratings. The Homicide production reverted to one episode a week. While some of the Ryan crew were rolled into new Crawfords serial The Box, that show featured little outdoors filming so inevitably some of the Ryan crew were retrenched - the first time Crawfords had ever retrenched staff.

Cast
 Rod Mullinar as Michael Ryan
 Pamela Stephenson as Julie King
 Luigi Villani as Tony Angelini
 Colin McEwan as Detective Cullen

Episodes

DVD release

The complete series was released on DVD in June 2018. It and other Crawford Productions series are available to international viewers from Eaton Films in the UK and Australia and New Zealand based buyers from Crawfords DVD. As well as the full run of 39 episodes, the DVD set includes the Homicide crossover episode "As Simple As ABZ".

References

External links
 Ryan at Classic Australian Television
 Ryan at Crawford Productions
 
Ryan at AustLit
episode "Catalyst" at AustLit

Australian adventure television series
1973 Australian television series debuts
1974 Australian television series endings
1970s Australian crime television series
Seven Network original programming
Black-and-white Australian television shows
Television series by Crawford Productions

ja:私立探偵ライアン